Guzalan (also Romanized as Gūzalān; also known as Gavzalān, Gāvzāleh, Goozalan, and Gūzlān) is a village in Yeylaq Rural District, in the Central District of Kaleybar County, East Azerbaijan Province, Iran. At the 2006 census, its population was 751, in 161 families.

References 

Populated places in Kaleybar County